The 2023 Quebec Scotties Tournament of Hearts, the provincial women's curling championship of Quebec, was held from January 10 to 14 at the Centre Sportif Mistouk d'Alma in Alma, Quebec. The winning Laurie St-Georges rink represented Quebec at the 2023 Scotties Tournament of Hearts in Kamloops, British Columbia, and finished in a four-way tie for second (seeded third) in Pool A with a 5–3 record, losing the tiebreaker game to British Columbia 8–3 for a spot in the Championship round. The event was held in conjunction with the 2023 Quebec Tankard, the provincial men's curling championship.

It was the first provincial title for St-Georges, though it will be her third national Scotties appearance, as Curling Quebec appointed her as the province's representative for the previous two national championships, as the Quebec Scotties had been cancelled due to the COVID-19 pandemic in Quebec.

Teams
The teams are listed as follows:

Round-robin standings
Final round-robin standings

Round-robin results
All draw times are listed in Eastern Time (UTC-05:00).

Draw 1
Tuesday, January 10, 8:30 pm

Draw 2
Wednesday, January 11, 4:00 pm

Draw 3
Thursday, January 12, 12:15 pm

Draw 4
Thursday, January 12, 8:00 pm

Draw 5
Friday, January 13, 12:15 pm

Playoffs

Semifinal
Friday, January 13, 8:00 pm

Final
Saturday, January 14, 6:30 pm

References

2023 Scotties Tournament of Hearts
Curling competitions in Quebec
Quebec Women's Provincial
January 2023 sports events in Canada
Alma, Quebec